Marcel Varnel (16 October 1892 – 13 July 1947) was French film director, notably however for his career in the United States and England as a director of plays and films

Biography
He was born Marcel Hyacinthe le Bozec in Paris, France.

Varnel started his working life on the Paris stage, soon becoming a director of musical comedies. In 1925 he moved to New York City working as director in several Broadway operettas, musicals and dramas for the Shubert family. This was followed by a move to Hollywood where he directed three low budget thrillers.

In 1934, he moved to England and it was as a director of British comedies – initially working at British International Pictures, Elstree, then moving in 1936 to Gainsborough Pictures – where he produced his best films. Among the performers he worked with were Will Hay, The Crazy Gang, Arthur Askey and George Formby.

He died in a car crash near Rake, West Sussex.

Films 
The Silent Witness (1932) (U.S.A.) – Director
Chandu the Magician (1932) (U.S.A.) – Director
Infernal Machine (1933) (U.S.A.) – Director
Freedom Of The Seas (1934) – Director
Girls Will Be Boys (1934) – Director
I Give My Heart (1935) – Director
Dance Band (1935) – Director
Royal Cavalcade also known as Regal Cavalcade in the U.S.A. (1935) – Director
No Monkey Business (1936) – Director
Public Nuisance No. 1 (1936) – Director
All In (1936) – Director
Okay For Sound (1936) – Director
Good Morning, Boys (1937) – Director
Oh, Mr Porter! (1937) – Director
Convict 99 (1938) – Director
Hey! Hey! USA! (1938) – Director
The Loves of Madame Dubarry (1938) – Director
Old Bones of the River (1938) – Director
Alf's Button Afloat (1938) – Director
Ask a Policeman (1939) – Director
Where's That Fire? (1939) – Director
The Frozen Limits (1939) – Director
Band Waggon (1940) – Director
Let George Do It! (1940) – Director
Gasbags (1940) – Director
The Ghost of St Michaels (1941) – Director
Turned Out Nice Again (1941) – Director
Hi, Gang! (1941) – Director
South American George (1941) – Director and Producer
I Thank You (1941) – Director
Neutral Port (1941) – Director
King Arthur Was a Gentleman (1942) – Director
Much Too Shy (1942) – Director
Get Cracking (1943) – Director
Bell Bottom George (1943) – Director
He Snoops to Conquer (1944) – Director and Producer
I Didn't Do It (1945) – Director and Producer
George in Civvy Street (1946) – Director and Producer
This Man Is Mine (1946) – Director and Producer

External links
 
 

1892 births
1947 deaths
Road incident deaths in England
Film directors from Paris